is a Japanese ski jumper. 

Ito has won six individual World Cup events, three team events, and finished as the overall runner-up in the 2016–17 season. At the World Championships she has won five medals, including a mixed team gold.

Career
Ito's debut in the FIS Ski Jumping World Cup took place in February 2012 in Hinzenbach. At the 2013 FIS Nordic World Ski Championships in Val di Fiemme, Ito won the gold medal with the Japanese team in the mixed event at normal hill. She won her first individual World Cup event on 14 January 2017 in Sapporo.

She competed at the 2014 Winter Olympics, finishing seventh in the women's normal hill individual competition. She also competed at the 2018 Winter Olympics in the same event.

Ito also won the first-ever women's World Cup team competition in Hinterzarten on 16 December 2017. Her teammates included Kaori Iwabuchi, Yuka Seto and Sara Takanashi.

Major tournament results

Olympics

FIS Nordic World Ski Championships

World Cup

Standings

Individual wins

References

External links 

 
 
 

1994 births
Living people
Japanese female ski jumpers
Olympic ski jumpers of Japan
Ski jumpers at the 2014 Winter Olympics
Ski jumpers at the 2018 Winter Olympics
Ski jumpers at the 2022 Winter Olympics
FIS Nordic World Ski Championships medalists in ski jumping
20th-century Japanese women
21st-century Japanese women